Wayman Carver (December 25, 1905, Portsmouth, Virginia – May 6, 1967, Atlanta) was an American jazz flutist and reeds player.

Carver was a rare jazz flautist active during the swing era, and was among the earliest soloists on his main instrument to perform jazz, although Alberto Socarras preceded him by about five years. His first professional experience was with J. Neal Montgomery. After he moved to New York City in 1931, he recorded and performed with Dave Nelson, and played with Elmer Snowden (1931–32), Benny Carter, and Spike Hughes (1933).

From 1934 to 1939, he played with Chick Webb on both saxophone and flute. After Webb died, he continued in the orchestra during its period of leadership under Ella Fitzgerald until 1941. After leaving the jazz scene, he became a professor of music at Clark College, where he taught saxophonists George Adams and Marion Brown, among others.

References

External links
 Wayman Carver recordings at the Discography of American Historical Recordings.

1905 births
1967 deaths
American jazz flautists
American jazz saxophonists
American male saxophonists
20th-century American saxophonists
Jazz musicians from Virginia
20th-century American male musicians
American male jazz musicians
20th-century flautists